Marceau Stricanne (1 January 1920 – 25 July 2012) was a French footballer who played for Le Havre AC, EF Lens-Artois, CO Roubaix-Tourcoing and Stade Français Paris. He also made an appearance for France national football team during a match against Austria in 1951 as a substitution of Thadée Cisowski.

References

1920 births
2012 deaths
French footballers
France international footballers
Le Havre AC players
CO Roubaix-Tourcoing players
Association football midfielders